Kristianstad (older spelling from Danish Christianstad) is a city and the seat of Kristianstad Municipality, Scania County, Sweden with 40,145 inhabitants in 2016. During the last 15 years, it has gone from a garrison town to a developed commercial city, today attracting visitors in the summertime mainly from Germany, Denmark and The Netherlands.

History

The city was founded in 1614 by King Christian IV of Denmark (the city's name literally means 'Town of Christian') as a planned city after the burning of the nearby town of Vä and moving the city rights of the neighbouring town of Sölvesborg and Åhus to the new town. The purpose of the town was to safeguard the eastern half of the Danish province of Scania against any future raids from Sweden in the north, but also as a symbol of the power of Christian himself. One of these raids had sacked the nearby town of Vä in 1612. Vä then lost its charter and the people were moved to the new, better fortified city. The king also founded the town of Christianopel in eastern Blekinge to serve a similar purpose.

Construction of the towns was a great prestige project for the king, and Kristianstad's church is considered by many to be one of the most beautiful buildings constructed by King Christian IV, or even northern Europe's most beautiful Renaissance church. This meant that the church was built considerably larger than there was initially use for. The king also wanted castle or fortress constructed inside the town but shortage of funds made this impossible, of the intended castle only an arsenal was constructed which today serves as the main building of the local museum. Also in Christianstad the town planning of the Renaissance could be laid down for the first time at the foundation of the town. This makes the Kristianstad town centre of today exceptionally well-kept and easy to get around in.

The city's coat of arms depicts two lions holding the King Christian IV's crowned insignia, the monogram C4. The coat of arms was only slightly modified after the Swedish takeover following the 1658 Treaty of Roskilde in which the eastern third of Denmark was ceded to Sweden. The coat of arms is very similar to the coat of arms of the former town of Christianopel in eastern Blekinge, a town also founded by Christian IV. Since 1971, the coat of arms is used by Kristianstad Municipality. Kristianstad's coat of arms is one of the few coat of arms in the world depicting a foreign king's or queen's coat of arms. A reason for the Swedes to continue using the old coat of arms could be its colours – blue and yellow, but Denmark is also held in high regard locally in Scania.

Pylyp Orlyk was after 1709 chosen as a Hetman in exile by the cossacks and the Swedish king Charles XII. While in Bender Orlyk wrote one of the first state constitutions in Europe. This Constitution of Pylyp Orlyk was confirmed by Charles XII and it also names him as the protector of Ukraine. After 1714 Orlyk now together with several other cossacks followed the Swedish king Charles XII to Sweden. Orlyk with his family and about 40 other Cossacks arrived in Ystad, Sweden in late November 1715. After some months in Ystad they lived in the city of Kristianstad for some years. Orlyk wrote numerous proclamations and essays about Ukraine including the 1710 Constitution of Pylyp Orlyk.

Kristianstad served as capital of Kristianstad County between 1719 and 1997. It now houses the administration and the regional parliament of the Skåne Regional Council. For a long time Kristianstad also was a very important garrison town, the A3 Wendes Artillery Regiment and the P6 South Scanian Infantry Regiment being the towns most prominent military units. Also the town housed for many years the so-called Scanian Fortification Brigade. The Wendes Artillery Regiment served with distinction in the Napoleonic Wars. One of Sweden's higher courts of appeal was located in Kristianstad before being moved to Malmö in 1917.

At the end of the 19th century, Christianstads Enskilda Bank (founded in 1865) issued banknotes with portraits of Christian IV instead of the Swedish king (the individual banks' right to issue banknotes ceased in 1898).

Until 1996, Kristianstad was a city of residence in Kristianstad County, but in 1997 merged with Skåne County. Since the county councils were also merged into Region Skåne, the city became the seat of its regional council from 1999. The County Administrative Court in Skåne County was also located in Kristianstad until 2008.

In Kristianstad, seven countries have maintained honorary consulates during different periods. A Royal Danish Vice Consulate was established in 1855 and elevated to a consulate in 2002, but was withdrawn in 2012. A North American consular agency existed 1873 — 1887 (the same man was the Danish deputy consul and North American consular agent). The independent Kingdom of Norway established a deputy consulate in 1907, which was, however, withdrawn in 1937, to be re-established in 1946 and elevated to a consulate in 1988, but it is now revoked. Argentina had a vice consulate 1911 — 1935. Finland also had a vice consulate in Kristianstad 1923 — 1925 and 1931 — 1967. Lithuania established a consulate in 1995 and it is the only consulate left in Kristianstad today. Germany established a consulate in 1996, but it is now withdrawn.

Geography
Sweden's lowest point, at 2.41 meters below mean sea level, is located in Kristianstad. Because of this, parts of the city have to be protected from flooding by a system of levees and water pumps. To expand the city, large areas of low-lying wetlands have had to be walled in, especially to the east. To prevent future flooding of the city center, the existing levees are in the process of being reinforced and new levees against both Helge å and Hammarsjön are under construction. An extensive system of ponds and dams is also under construction. The threat of flooding became substantial during late winter 2002, when the greater part of the public park Tivoliparken was under water. However, the wetlands around the city are starting to be regarded more as an asset, not least thanks to the creation of Kristianstads Vattenrike Biosphere Reserve. Today the Vattenriket is a Unesco biosphere reserve.

Climate
Kristianstad has a humid continental climate.
Summers are warm and comparatively long by Swedish standards.

Environmental
Kristianstad has by now crossed a vital threshold, as the city and adjacent municipality, with a population of 80,000, in essence use no oil, natural gas or coal to warm homes and businesses, even throughout the extensive chilly winters. It is an absolute turnaround from 20 years ago, when all of its heating came from fossil fuels.

Industry
Absolut Vodka, owned by Pernod Ricard, is produced by the town of Åhus located within the municipality. Kristianstad was the main military seat in Scania for a long time, boosting military camps and trainings. After the reforms and military cutbacks of the 1990s all of these have been closed, although a new military presence is being established in nearby Rinkaby which holds an old military training ground. Also in and around Kristianstad are numerous enterprises concerned with agriculture and it is usually said that every Swede everyday eats something produced from Kristianstad. At the old garrison ground for the P6 South Scanian Infantry Regiment (later mechanized) there is today the local Kristianstad University which is specialized in educating teachers and nurses.

Culture
The Swedish Film industry (Svensk Filmindustri) commenced its activities in Kristianstad in the 1910s,  before moving to Stockholm in 1920. Today the old studio is a museum.

Events
The 2011 World Scout Jamboree was held near Rinkaby, in Kristianstad Municipality. Also every summer there is a huge beachhandboll tournament in Åhus.

Notable natives
Magnus Colcord Heurlin Artist Alaska
Ingeman Arbnor, economist
Fredrik Böök, author
Bror Erik Friberg, Judge of Assessment Court, New Zealand, 1877
Ann-Louise Hanson, singer
Bo Lundgren, politician
Robert Karl Wallner, scientist
Emma Lundberg, artist and architect
Augusta Lundin, fashion designer
Hulda Lundin, sloyd educator
Åke Ohlmarks, writer
Johan Christopher Toll, soldier
Carl Ludvig Trägårdh, artist
Lisa Nordén, professional triathlete, 2008 Olympian and 2012 Olympic silver medalist
Timothy Liljegren, profession ice hockey player, Toronto Maple Leafs draftee
Daniel Liljeroth, professional e-sports player
Kosovare Asllani, professional football player

Sister cities
Kristianstad has eight sister cities: 
 Espoo, Finland
 Køge, Denmark
 Rendsburg, Germany
 Skagafjörður, Iceland
 Budafok, Hungary
 Koszalin, Poland
 Šiauliai, Lithuania
 Kongsberg, Norway

Sights

See also
University College of Kristianstad
Kristianstad County (abolished 1998)
Kristianstad Tourism
Kristianstads Vattenrike Biosphere Reserve

References 
 Some material has been incorporated from the corresponding article on Swedish Wikipedia
Brew, Margit Scandinavian footprints: a history of Scandinavians settling in New Zealand Auckland, NZ: M.Brew, c2007.

Notes

External links

Kristianstad Municipality - Official site
Using Waste, Swedish City Cuts Its Fossil Fuel Use

 
Populated places in Skåne County
Municipal seats of Skåne County
Swedish municipal seats
Populated places established in 1614
Lowest points
17th-century establishments in Skåne County
Cities in Skåne County